The Sound+Vision Tour was a 1990 concert tour by English musician David Bowie that was billed as a greatest hits tour in which Bowie would retire his back catalogue of hit songs from live performance. The tour opened at the Colisée de Québec in Quebec City, Canada on 4 March 1990 before reaching its conclusion at the River Plate Stadium in Buenos Aires, Argentina on 29 September 1990, spanning five continents in seven months. The concert tour surpassed Bowie's previous Serious Moonlight (1983) and Glass Spider (1987) tours' statistics by visiting 27 countries with 108 performances.

Édouard Lock of La La La Human Steps co-conceived and was artistic director for this tour.

Tour history
Bowie's previous Glass Spider Tour and two most recent albums (Tonight (1984) and Never Let Me Down (1987)) had all been critically dismissed, and Bowie was looking for a way to rejuvenate himself artistically. To this end, Bowie wanted to avoid having to play his old hits live forever, and used the release of the Sound + Vision box set as the impetus for a tour, despite having no new material recorded. Bowie took a break from his band Tin Machine for "Sound+Vision", telling the band he was contractually obligated to do the tour. He invited fellow Tin Machine guitarist Reeves Gabrels to tour with him, but Gabrels declined, and instead suggested Adrian Belew, with whom both Gabrels and Bowie had worked previously. Gabrels called Belew and said “'I have this friend who is going on tour, and he needs a guitar player. He asked me and I can’t do it, but I thought you might want to do it,' and I put David on the phone."

It was stated that Bowie would never perform these greatest hits on tour again. Bowie said "knowing I won't ever have those songs to rely on again spurs me to keep doing new things, which is good for an artist," and later, "I  have no intentions of parroting my own songs, which is what it ends up being after you've been doing it for 20 years. You can't do it with any more enthusiasm. I don't care who you are, you get to the point where you don't like singing the song anymore."

Bowie looked forward to retiring his old hits, saying "It's time to put about 30 or 40 songs to bed and it's my intention that this will be the last time I'll ever do those songs completely, because if I want to make a break from what I've done up until now, I've got to make it concise and not have it as a habit to drop back into. It's so easy to kind of keep going on and saying, well, you can rely on those songs, you can rely on that to have a career or something, and I'm not sure I want that."

He would state in another contemporary interview that "I want to finish off that old phase and start again. By the time I'm in my later forties, I will have built up a whole new repertoire."

It has been noted that Bowie is "famous" for claiming retirement in the past, so many critics and observers did not fully believe Bowie when he said he would not play these songs again.

Bowie spent the early few months of 1990 preparing for the tour in a rehearsal hall on Manhattan's west side.

Song selection

It was announced that the set-list for any given performance of the tour would be partially determined by the most popular titles logged in a telephone poll by calling the premium-rate telephone number 1-900-2-BOWIE-90. Money earned from phone calls to the number were donated to two charities, Save the Children and a Brixton charity. Mail-in ballots were made available to vote by in territories where telephone technology was not available.

Bowie did in fact build the tour's setlist from calls to the phone number from all over the world, saying "What I ended up doing was taking about seven or eight [songs] from [the calls in] England, another seven or eight from the rest of Europe and the rest I made up from America so it's a good sampling of what everybody wanted in all the continents." The first shows of the tour held in March 1990 in Canada were performed before any telephone polls were completed, leading Bowie to guess at the list of songs the audience wanted to hear.

In the US, the songs "Fame", "Let's Dance" and "Changes" topped the list of songs requested by fans, while in Europe the songs "Heroes" and "Blue Jean" were the leaders.

The NME, in response to the telephone poll, ran a spoof campaign, Just Say Gnome, in an effort to have "The Laughing Gnome" included in the set-lists. Bowie had considered playing "The Laughing Gnome" "in the style of The Velvets or something" until he found out the voting had been perpetrated by the music magazine.

Set design
Édouard Lock (of La La La Human Steps) co-conceived and was artistic director for this tour. Bowie had originally wanted La La La Human Steps to be involved in his previous Glass Spider Tour, but was unable to secure them due to scheduling conflicts. Given the unfavorable attention that his previous solo tour drew, Bowie was keen to make sure the Sound+Vision Tour did things differently. He said, "It will be staged; there is no way I could ever consider really putting something on the stage that doesn't owe something to theatah (pronouncing 'theatre' in a thick British accent), but it won't be overtly theatre in as much as it won't be propped the same way. Going back to the way we worked towards the Station to Station show, which was basically a question of using a kind of Brechtian lighting pad and working areas and atmospheres of light, is very much the kind of feel it will have." Bowie recruited Willie Williams to design the lighting for the tour, having worked with him on the preceding year's Tin Machine "It's My Life Tour".

He added that this tour is "nowhere near as ambitious as Glass Spider in size, but qualitatively, in essence, I think it's as theatrical."

In addition to the stark lighting and the backing 4-piece rock band, Bowie employed a new tool for this tour: a giant sixty-by-forty foot transparent gauze scrim. The scrim would occasionally be lowered in front of or behind Bowie, onto which images of Bowie and videos were projected. Bowie described it as being "like a giant Javanese shadow puppet show at times." Two large, round screens at each side of the stage also displayed the videos projected on the scrim.

The set was constructed by 80 workers who traveled with the tour, with the help of local workers who were hired in each city. A single set took 8 trucks to move (with an additional 4 buses for the workers), and required 9 hours to set up and 4 hours to load out each night.

Video recordings of La La La Human Steps' Louise Lecavalier performing dances in time to the music and images of Bowie singing, playing instruments, miming or otherwise performing to certain songs were projected on the scrim & screens during the show. For some dates, such as the performance in Montreal on 6 March 1990, some of the dancers from La La La Human Steps danced live on stage to some of the songs. Bowie was enthusiastic about the inclusion of the dancers on the tour: "You've never seen anything like them before. They're probably the leading avant-garde dance troupe in North America. Louise Lecavalier, their star, is like nothing else you've ever seen on stage. She's absolutely phenomenal. ... The dance troupe is unbelievable. It's where punk and ballet clash with each other."

Fame '90
With no new material recorded, to coincide with the tour, Bowie released an updated remix of his 1975 single "Fame", titled "Fame '90". He had wanted to remix one of his successful US singles, and "Let's Dance" was considered, but was rejected as Bowie thought it too recent. For the music video, he danced with Louise Lecavalier, one of the main dancers of La La La Human Steps. A remix of the song was included on the soundtrack for the movie Pretty Woman (1990), and the US version of the video replaces some of Bowie's music videos for scenes from the movie.

Live recordings
Bowie wanted to record the concert, something he hadn't always done before, saying "We're intending to film it for posterity; I should hope so. I've always regretted not having filmed things like the 'Diamond Dogs' show. We never filmed the 'Station to Station' show. Or the 'soul' show with Dave Sanborn and those guys. I have absolutely no footage of those things. It's terrible. ... It's infuriating."

Despite this, no official recording of the show has been made available to the public in either audio or video form. A number of performances were filmed and recorded for television and radio broadcasts:

Contemporary reception and reviews

Rolling Stone described the 1990 summer concert season "a concert season to remember", and included the Sound+Vision Tour as one of its highlights. They said "Louise Lecavalier of Montreal's La La La Human Steps dance troupe provides avant-garde acrobatics, and several [musical] numbers are graced by stunning short films, including a clip for "Ashes to Ashes" that has to be seen to be believed. Otherwise, there are no pyrotechnics, no laser beams and, best of all, no glass spiders," the last a reference to Bowie's previous world tour. A review of an early show by Rolling Stone was positive, saying "Bowie proved able to reclaim virtually his entire diverse oeuvre – even those songs that now seem furthest from him – through sheer vocal power and charisma" and complaining only that "the band wasn't always equal to the challenge, demonstrating too much respect for the songs' recorded arrangements." A review of the show's stop in Vancouver, BC said "Bowie hasn't sounded this good in years", praising the tour's focus on not only the songs, but on Bowie himself, and a review of the show in Seattle called the visuals "a knockout" and praised Bowie as an innovator, only complaining that the music itself seemed "mechanical."

While some shows on the North American tour did not sell out, such as in Seattle and some dates in Florida, overall the tour was well-attended. It sold out, often over multiple nights, in cities such as San Francisco, Sacramento, Philadelphia and Detroit.

The UK show at Milton Keynes Bowl was reviewed negatively by Melody Maker magazine, who called parts of the performance "flat" and dismissed the song "Pretty Pink Rose" as "a tall heap of shite."

Tour incidents
Mid-tour, Bowie, Erdal Kızılçay and guitarist Adrian Belew joined blues artist Buddy Guy in Chicago for a performance at Guy's Legends Night Club, which coincided with the NAMM Expo, where Guy was celebrated.

A month later in Philadelphia, Bowie stopped his performance in the middle of the song "Young Americans" to speak out against music censorship, specifically due to the controversy over 2 Live Crew's album As Nasty As They Wanna Be, saying "I've been listening to the album by 2 Live Crew. It's not the best album that's ever been made, but when I heard they banned it, I went out and bought it. Freedom of thought, freedom of speech – it's one of the most important things we have."

During the show in Modena, Bowie stopped his performance while in the middle of "Station to Station" and said onstage "Ok, I'm gonna have to pick some easier songs, or I'm never gonna get through half of these... Let's try Fame." then Bowie proceeded to take his guitar and throw it at the other side of the stage. It is said that Bowie had a cold and he became frustrated that it was affecting his vocals.

Tour statistics
The tour opened at the Colisée de Québec – Quebec City on 4 March 1990 before reaching its conclusion in Buenos Aires, Argentina on 29 September 1990, spanning five continents in seven months. The concert tour surpassed the previous Serious Moonlight and Glass Spider Tour's statistics by visiting 27 countries with 108 performances. For the ten performances in the United Kingdom alone it was estimated the audience figure was 250,000 in total. The tour was estimated to have grossed $20M (or roughly $M today, adjusted for inflation).

Tour legacy
Bowie felt that a burden had been lifted by retiring the old hits he felt he was forced to perform, and said "[Retiring my old hits on tour] was a very selfish thing to do, but it gave me an immense sense of freedom, to feel that I couldn't rely on any of those things. It's like I'm approaching it all from the ground up now, starting with 'Okay, we know what songs we needn't do anymore. What, of my past, did I really like?' You pick things that were really good songs, and you try to recontextualize them, by giving them current, contemporary rhythms. And we've been knocking around ideas like 'Shopping for Girls' from Tin Machine, 'Repetition' and 'Quicksand' from Hunky Dory. Certain songs that I probably haven't ever performed onstage. They're working shoulder to shoulder with the new material, and I'm starting to see continuity in the way that I work."

Generally, most songs that Bowie performed on the tour were played live in years to come, with only a small number of songs from the Sound+Vision Tour set list truly being retired forever; the most notable songs never to be played live again were "Young Americans" and "Rock 'n' Roll Suicide". Bowie only played "Space Oddity" on tour a single time afterwards, although Bowie did perform the song three times on other occasions. In future tours Bowie would in fact begin to play lesser-known songs, only occasionally punctuated by his well known older "hits", and bias towards playing material written after 1990. After finishing the Sound+Vision tour, Bowie returned to his band Tin Machine for their second album.

The concert in Zagreb, Yugoslavia, held on 5 September 1990, was the city's last great concert before the country descended into war and broke up.

Tour band
Bowie specifically chose a smaller band for the tour, saying in a contemporary interview that "It's a much smaller sound. It's not quite as orchestrated as any of the other tours. The plus of that is that there is a certain kind of drive and tightness that you get with that embryonic line-up, where everybody is totally reliant on the other two or three guys, so everybody gives a lot more." There was some tension in the band during the tour, remembered musician Kızılçay, who recalled that Bowie "wasn't very happy," and that "[Bowie] was very stressed, especially in South America. He didn’t even come to the sound checks. Keyboardist Rick Fox wasn't invested in the tour; he would occasionally eat dinner on stage, and on at least one occasion turned off his own keyboards and played his own songs while sampled parts of Bowie's songs were playing.
 David Bowie – vocals, guitar, saxophone
 Adrian Belew – guitar, backing vocals, music director
 Erdal Kızılçay – bass guitar, backing vocals
 Rick Fox – keyboards, backing vocals
 Michael Hodges – drums

Setlist
This performance is from the Milton Keynes Bowl, Milton Keynes, England show at 5 August 1990.
 "Space Oddity"
 "Rebel Rebel"
 "Ashes to Ashes"
 "Fashion"
 "Life on Mars?"
 "Pretty Pink Rose"
 "Sound and Vision"
 "Blue Jean"
 "Let's Dance"
 "Stay"
 "Ziggy Stardust"
 "China Girl"
 "Station to Station"
 "Young Americans"
 "Suffragette City"
 "Fame"
 ""Heroes""Encore
 "Changes"
 "The Jean Genie"
 "White Light/White Heat"
 "Modern Love"

Tour dates

Songs

From David Bowie
 "Space Oddity"
From Hunky Dory
 "Changes"
 "Life on Mars?"
 "Queen Bitch"
From The Rise and Fall of Ziggy Stardust and the Spiders from Mars
 "Starman"
 "Ziggy Stardust"
 "Suffragette City"
 "Rock 'n' Roll Suicide"
From Aladdin Sane
 "Panic in Detroit"
 "The Jean Genie"
From Live Santa Monica '72
 "I'm Waiting for the Man" (from The Velvet Underground & Nico (1967) by The Velvet Underground and Nico; written by Lou Reed; outtake from 1966–72 sessions)
From Ziggy Stardust: The Motion Picture
 "White Light/White Heat" (originally from White Light/White Heat (1968) by The Velvet Underground; written by Lou Reed)
From Diamond Dogs
 "Rebel Rebel"
From Young Americans
 "Young Americans"
 "Fame" (Bowie, John Lennon, Carlos Alomar)
From Station to Station
 "Station to Station"
 "Golden Years"
 "TVC 15"
 "Stay"

From Low
 "Sound and Vision"
 "Be My Wife"
From "Heroes"
 ""Heroes"" (Bowie, Brian Eno)
From Scary Monsters (and Super Creeps)
 "Ashes to Ashes"
 "Fashion"
From Let's Dance
 "Modern Love"
 "China Girl" (originally from The Idiot (1977) by Iggy Pop; written by Pop and Bowie)
 "Let's Dance"
From Tonight
 "Blue Jean"
Other songs:
 "A Hard Rain's A-Gonna Fall" (from The Freewheelin' Bob Dylan (1963) by Bob Dylan; written by Dylan)
 "Alabama Song" (originally from Bertolt Brecht's opera Rise and Fall of the City of Mahagonny; written by Brecht and Kurt Weill; released a non-album single (1980))
 "Amsterdam" (originally from Enregistrement Public à l'Olympia 1964 by Jacques Brel, written by Brel & Mort Shuman; B-side of the Sorrow" single (1973))
 "Baby, Please Don't Go" (originally a single (1935) by Big Joe Williams)
 "Baby What You Want Me to Do" (originally a single (1959) by Jimmy Reed; famously covered by Elvis Presley (1968))
 "Fame '90 (House mix)" (new version of said song from Young Americans (originally from 1975); released as a single in 1990)
 "Heartbreak Hotel" (originally a single (1956) by Elvis Presley, written by Presley, Mae Boren Axton and Thomas Durden)
 ""Helden"" (German language version of the song from "Heroes"; appears on some versions of the ""Heroes"" single)
 "John, I'm Only Dancing" (released as a non-album single in 1972 with a sax version released the following year; written by Bowie)
 "Pretty Pink Rose" (from Young Lions (1990) by Adrian Belew; written by Bowie)
 "You and I and George" (traditional)
 "Gloria" (originally by Them, it was first released as a B-side to the "Baby, Please Don't Go" single (1964) and later found on The Angry Young Them'' (1965); written by Van Morrison)

References

1990 concert tours
David Bowie concert tours